Jakhania is a vidhan sabha seat in Ghazipur district in India.

Bedi ram is a MLA from this seat. Jakhania (Jakhanian) station is situated at 70 km(nearly) from Varanasi to the North. There is a railway station in Jakhanian. There are several educational institutions located in Jakhania.
It's pin code is 275203.

References

External links
results:218 
 

Cities and towns in Ghazipur district